Geneva Township is one of sixteen townships in Franklin County, Iowa, United States.  As of the 2010 census, its population was 324 and it contained 155 housing units.

History
Geneva Township was created in 1858.

Geography

Cities, towns, villages
 Geneva

Cemeteries
The township contains Fourmile Grove Cemetery and Lindenwood Cemetery.

School districts
 Agwsr Community School District
 Hampton-Dumont Community School District

Political districts
 Iowa's 4th congressional district
 State House District 54
 State Senate District 27

References

External links
 City-Data.com

Townships in Iowa
Townships in Franklin County, Iowa
Populated places established in 1858
1858 establishments in Iowa